Roy Friend (born 16 May 1982) is a former professional rugby league player who played six games for the Cronulla-Sutherland Sharks.

NRL career
Friend made his rugby league debut for Cronulla in 1983. His first and only try came in the Shark’s round 26 loss to the Canterbury-Bankstown Bulldogs. During that game he was also reprimanded by Cronulla captain Brett Kimmorley for backtalk.

Post-NRL career
After his stint in the NRL, Friend was playing with the Tweed Heads Seagulls as of 2008.

References

Cronulla-Sutherland Sharks players
Living people
1982 births
Australian rugby league players
Tweed Heads Seagulls players
Rugby league props